Hg is the symbol of chemical element mercury (from its Latin name ).

Hg, hg, HG, inHg or "Hg may also refer t

Arts and media
H. G. Wells, English writer
House & Garden or HG, a former US magazine
Harry G. Nelson, half of the Roy and HG comedy duo
Hengwrt Chaucer or Hg, a manuscript of the Canterbury Tales
Masaki Sumitani or HG, Japanese professional wrestler

Organizations
 Hg (equity firm), headquartered in London and Munich
 Hengdian Group, a Chinese private conglomerate
 Hlinka Guard, a militia movement of the Slovak People's Party from 1938 to 1945
 Niki (airline) (IATA code HG)

Places
HG postcode area, in Yorkshire, England
Bad Homburg vor der Höhe, Germany (vehicle plate code HG)
Hillgrove Secondary School, a secondary school in Bukit Batok, Singapore

Science and technology
Hg, the chemical symbol for mercury
hg, the driver program of Mercurial, a version Control system
Hectogram, a unit of weight equal to 100 grams
Hyperemesis gravidarum, a complication of pregnancy
Inch of mercury, a unit of measurement for pressure
Human geography, a branch of geography

Other uses
His/Her Grace, a style used for various high-ranking personages
Huge-Gigantacus, a hero in the mobile video game Plants vs. Zombies Heroes

See also
Archer Maclean's Mercury or [Hg] Hydrium, a video game
Hengdian, Zhejiang, China